Thomas Jefferson High School, usually referred to as Jefferson High School, is a public high school in the Los Angeles Unified School District. Founded in 1916, it is the fourth oldest high school in the school district. Located in South Los Angeles, its surrounding communities are Downtown, Central-Alameda,  Florence, Historic South-Central and South Park. Jefferson's school colors are kelly green and gold and the sports teams are called the Democrats, or Demos for short. In 2006, a pilot program called New Tech: Student Empowerment Academy began in the northeast portion of the school. New Tech has since become a separate charter school housed in the Jefferson building. In 2016 New Tech closed down and the available space is now used by Nava College Preparatory Academy a pilot school that was established in 2014.

History

In 1915, the citizens  of Los Angeles voted to sell bonds to raise $4,600,000 to build schools in the Los Angeles area. Approximately $500,000 was appropriated to build Jefferson High School on the "Stadium East Grounds" (The Old Coliseum) which held approximately 25,000 people in a circled amphitheater configuration. The "Stadium," as it was known, was the site for hosting and entertaining travelers on the way to both the San Diego and San Francisco world expos in 1915. Numerous rodeos and bicycle races were held at the location.

Architect Norman F. Marsh was hired to design the new Jefferson High School complex, the property front 1235 feet on Hooper Avenue, 1149 feet on Compton Avenue, and 952 feet on 34th Street and 392 feet on 38th street. The buildings of the group would be of brick and concrete construction, being faced with rug tapestry brick and trimmed with artificial stone. All corridors and stairways would be made absolutely fireproof. The classical style would be followed, each of the main structures having a dignified entrance portico with stone pediment and columns.

Jefferson opened its doors on September 11, 1916, with 24 faculty members and two buildings completed. Theodore Fulton was installed as the school's first principal.

On March 10, 1933, a magnitude 6.4 earthquake in the city of Long Beach completely destroyed the infrastructure of the six buildings which composed the Jefferson High School Campus. The campus was closed from March 10 until April 6 while the school board assessed the situation. On April 6, tent bungalows provided by the school board were erected on the football fields. Classes were shortened to half day sessions in order to serve the entire student population.

Reconstruction
In 1933, Architect Stiles O. Clements was hired to build a 45-unit campus with a budget of $353,000.  The "Streamline Modern" building structures were completed in 1935. Ross Dickinson was selected and funded by Federal Art Project to paint four 11 feet by 5.5 foot murals with the theme "The History of Recorded Word". The murals were completed in 1937.

As of 1936, several notable alumni such as Ralph Bunche, Woody Strode and Samuel R. Browne had graduated from Jefferson High School. All three men were African American, the first of many Jefferson alumni to break racial barriers in the politics of diplomacy, the art of dance, the art of music and the interpretation of sports. Jefferson produced more jazz musicians and composers than any other high school west of the Mississippi. Many of the musicians were nurtured under the guidance of Samuel R. Browne.

Post-reconstruction
It was in the Los Angeles City High School District until 1961, when it merged into LAUSD.

Athletics

In 1937, Jefferson won the first of eight California State Championships in track and field (1937, 1949, 1950, 1951, 1952, 1956, 1962, and 1964).  The four consecutive state championships in California (1949, 1950, 1951 and 1952) have not been surpassed today. Woody Strode is one of two men who broke the color barrier in the National Football League in 1946. Mal Whitfield and Charles Dumas both received gold medals in the Olympics.  This is a rare instance when two Olympic Gold medalists have come from the same high school.

Music
Jefferson High has produced more prominent jazz musicians and composers than any other public or private high school in California. The school's music classes greatly impacted the participation of teenagers and young musicians in the Central Avenue jazz scene, its curriculum offering courses in music theory, music appreciation, harmony, counterpoint, orchestra, band, and choir. The hiring of influential teacher Samuel Browne in 1936 marked the beginning of a shift toward an integrated faculty in LA County public secondary schools and a pedagogical approach that emphasized mentorship, encouragement, and involvement with students and their families.

Academic configuration
Jefferson is a traditional calendar school, composed of four Small Learning Communities (SLCs) and the Early College program which is located at L.A. Trade Tech. The goal of each SLC is to offer individualized attention to students. The SLCs are as follows:

Academy of Business & Communication (ABC): focuses on building leaders in the liberal arts, retail, medical, legal and business fields.
Creative Arts and Expression (CAE): focuses on the creative energy and leadership within each student through the arts. 
Global Outlook through Academic Leadership: focuses on building leaders in the social, political, environmental, health and economic fields
TPA Small Learning Community: focuses on building leaders in the education and social services fields

The Early College Program (Jefferson/Trade Tech. Incentive) accepts students, based on recommendation and interview, who have "extenuating circumstances" requiring special support to achieve college acceptance.

Notable alumni

Dancers and choreographers
 Alvin Ailey – choreographer and activist; founded the Alvin Ailey American Dance Theater in New York City.
 Carmen De Lavallade – dancer and actor

Television and film actors
 Theresa Harris – African American character actress and singer, notable early films include Hold Your Man (1932) starring Jean Harlow and Clark Gable, Baby Face (1933) starring Barbara Stanwyck, and Professional Sweetheart (1933) starring Ginger Rogers
 Woody Strode – African American actor and football player, acted in films including The Ten Commandments, Spartacus, and Posse
 Juanita Moore – actress, fourth African American nominated for an Oscar. Participated in over 50 movies; best known for her role as the mother in the movie Imitation of Life
 Suzette Harbin – African American actress and dancer in films
 Roland Got – Chinese American actor, best known for The Good Earth (1937)
 Matthew Beard Jr. – African American actor, best known as Stymie in Our Gang (The Little Rascals) shorts

Television and film production and design
 Iwao Takamoto – animator and character designer for Walt Disney Productions and Hanna-Barbera
 John Meehan – art director and production designer

Politicians and judges
 Ralph Bunche – Educator, UN mediator on Palestine and Nobel Peace Prize Winner
 Thelton Henderson – federal judge in the Northern District of California.
 Willard H. Murray, Jr. – California State Assembly Member 1988–1996 (District 52); California Institute for the Preservation of Jazz. Current director of the Water Replenishment District 1. Father of Former State Senator Kevin Murray ref: Testimony of Buddy Collette & Marl Young
 Augustus F. Hawkins – U.S. House of Representatives from California's 21st and 29th district from 1963–1991; California assembly from 1935–1963
 David W. Williams – Judge for the United States District Court for the Central District of California; first African American Federal Judge from states west of the Mississippi.
 William R. Clay – Appointed by Governor Jerry Brown to Superior Court judge in October 1976
Earl C. Gay – Los Angeles City Council member, 1933–45
Mablean Ephriam – prosecuting attorney on television series Divorce Court and Justice with Judge Mablean

Journalists
 Stanley Crouch – syndicated columnist and novelist best known for his jazz criticism and his 2004 novel Don't the Moon Look Lonesome?

Composers, songwriters, and music directors
 Roy Ayers – Jazz Composer and Vibraphone player – Arranged Musical Score for 1973 movie "Coffy" and classic albums "Running Away 1976" and "Mystic Voyage 1975".
 Richard Berry – singer-songwriter, original performer of the rock standard "Louie Louie"
 Rickey Minor – Emmy-nominated music director, composer, and music producer for shows including The Tonight Show with Jay Leno, American Idol and Don't Forget The Lyrics!
 Barry White – record producer, singer-songwriter; five-time Grammy Award winner. White attended Jefferson for sophomore and junior year.
 Horace Tapscott – Jazz Piano player and composer Subject of UCLA Jazz Archive called the Horace Tapscott Collection. Creator of "The Pan Afrikan Peoples Arkestra (P.A.P.A.)".
 Jesse Belvin – Songwriter, Singer – Co-Wrote "Goodnight My Love" used to end Alan Freed Show;  co-credited as one of writers of "Earth Angel" made popular by The Penguins.
 Johnny "Guitar" Watson – blues and funk singer-songwriter and guitarist
 Young Jessie – R&B and jazz singer-songwriter

Instrumental musicians
 Dexter Gordon – jazz saxophonist known for his music and Starring role in the movie Round Midnight
 Sonny Criss  – jazz saxophone player – transferred from Jordan High School to Jefferson
 Bobby J Watson – R&B/funk bassist
 Addison Farmer – jazz bassist
 Frank Morgan – jazz saxophone player
 Chico Hamilton – jazz drummer
 Lee Young – jazz drummer
 Jack McVea  – jazz and Dixieland saxophone player
 Art Farmer – jazz trumpet player
 Bill Douglass – jazz drummer
 Ernie Royal – jazz trumpet player
 Marshal Royal – jazz saxophone player
 Lammar Wright, Jr. – jazz trumpet player
 Vi Redd – jazz saxophone player
 Jackie Kelson – jazz saxophone player
 Ginger Smock – concert and jazz violinist
 Don Cherry – jazz trumpet player
 Melba Liston – jazz trombone player – attended Jefferson, but later transferred to Polytechnic High School
 Ed Thigpen – jazz drummer
 Big Jay McNeely – jazz saxophone player – transferred from Jordan to Jefferson

Singers
 Curtis Williams and Bruce Tate – members of doo-wop group The Penguins
 Gaynel Hodge, Alex Hodge, and Cornell Gunter – members of musical group The Platters
 Ray Brewster – member of the groups The Hollywood Flames, The Cadillacs, The Penguins and The Platters
 Johnnie Martin – member of the gospel group Mighty Clouds of Joy
 Etta James – blues singer famous for hit song "At Last"
 Ernie Andrews – jazz and blues singer
 Merry Clayton – solo musician and backup singer for many artists, including Mick Jagger
 O.C. Smith – jazz singer and minister who performed with Count Basie Orchestra; he recorded the first version of the song "That Life" made famous by Frank Sinatra. He had numerous hit songs in his long career.
 Mel Walker – lead singer with the Johnny Otis Orchestra
 Cornell Gunter – R&B singer and member of The Platters and The Coasters. Transferred to Manual Arts his senior year.
 Jennell Hawkins – R&B and jazz singer
 Ivie Anderson – jazz singer, performed with Duke Ellington's orchestra between 1931 and 1942
 Richard Berry – singer, songwriter, and musician. Most famous for writing Louie Louie, Berry performed with numerous Los Angeles doo-wop groups including The Flairs. Joseph (Virgil) Johns1960s the Marathons 1983 Barry White's Westwing * Floyd Dixon
 Jose A Lechuga – singer, songwriter and musician. Founder of Regional Mexican Music band Cumbre Norteña

Military
 Theodore Lumpkin Jr. (1919 - 2020) – Tuskegee airmen, socialworker and businessman

Visual Artists
 Kerry James Marshall – American artist

Sports
 Emmett Ashford – first African-American umpire in major league baseball
 Andy Bakjian – National Track and Field Hall of Fame official. Bakjian was a longtime coach at Jefferson.
 Don Bishop – football player for the Dallas Cowboys, Pittsburgh Steelers, and Chicago Bears
 Otis Burrell – 5 time National Champion in the high jump, 1966 NCAA Champion at University of Nevada, Reno, Pan American Games silver medalist.
 Milt Davis – football player for the Baltimore Colts from 1957 to 1961, including winning the 1958 NFL Championship game
 Romeo Doubs  –  football player for the Green Bay Packers
 Charles Dumas – Olympic high jumper and the first person to clear seven feet. Attended Jefferson in his sophomore and Junior years; transferred to Centennial High School in Compton.
 Joe Kelly – football player for the Cincinnati Bengals
 Edgar Lacey – UCLA basketball player
 Lee Maye – Major League Baseball player
 Glenn McDonald – basketball player for the Boston Celtics
 Bill McGill – NBA basketball player 
 Bernard Quarles – NFL and CFL football player
 Woody Strode – NFL and CFL football player and decathlete who went on to become an actor
 Mal Whitfield – Middle-distance runner and Olympic gold medalist

Academic Performance Index (API)
API for High Schools in the LAUSD District 5 and local small public charter high schools in the East Los Angeles region.

Notes

See also
"Sisters at Heart", a 1970 episode of the TV series Bewitched that was written by students at Jefferson High School after having visited the set of that show and interacted with the cast and writers.

References

External links
 Jefferson High School (official website)
 Behind the Scenes: Poverty, gangs plague some L.A. students
 The Los Angeles Times: Data Desk: Mapping L.A.: Neighborhoods
 Bringing music to the people by Anthony Macías

High schools in Los Angeles County, California
Los Angeles Unified School District schools
Public high schools in California
South Los Angeles
1916 establishments in California
Educational institutions established in 1916
Neoclassical architecture in California
Morgan, Walls & Clements buildings
Streamline Moderne architecture in California